An Italian Name is a 2015 Italian comedy film directed by Francesca Archibugi.

The film is based on the French play Le Prénom and its 2012 film adaptation What's in a Name?.

Cast 
 Alessandro Gassmann - Paolo
 Valeria Golino - Betta
 Micaela Ramazzotti - Simona
 Luigi Lo Cascio - Sandro
 Rocco Papaleo - Claudio
 Carolina Cetroli

Awards

References

External links 

2015 films
2015 comedy films
Italian comedy films
Films directed by Francesca Archibugi
2010s Italian films
2010s Italian-language films